Saint Sophie Ukrainian Orthodox Cathedral is a Ukrainian Orthodox cathedral in Montreal, Quebec, Canada. It is located on Saint-Michel Boulevard, corner De Bellechasse Street, in the borough of Rosemont–La Petite-Patrie.

It was designed by architect Volodymyr Sichynsky and constructed from 1960 to 1962. Its front facade is in stone, although its exterior walls are made of brick. Its roof is made of copper. In 1988, St. Sophie was elevated to the status of "cathedral."

The parish priest is the Very Reverend Father Volodymyr Kouchnir.

Religious Services 

 Divine Liturgy (in Ukrainian) at 10:00 a.m. every Sunday and 9:30 a.m. on weekdays as prescribed by the Ukrainian Orthodox Church of Canada
 Bilingual (Ukrainian & English) service on special holidays
 Sunday School (For children ages 5 and over): Sunday at 10:00 am in the Parish Hall.

References

External links
Sophie Cathedral

Saint Sophie
Rosemont–La Petite-Patrie
Saint Sophie
Churches completed in 1962
Saint Sophie Ukrainian Orthodox Cathedral
Ukrainian-Canadian culture in Quebec
Church buildings with domes
1962 establishments in Quebec
20th-century churches in Canada